Manuel Lillo Torregrosa is a Spanish composer born in 1940 in San Vicente del Raspeig, Alicante. He joined the Banda Sinfónica Municipal de Madrid in 1959, and became E-flat clarinet (requinto in the Spanish language) soloist for them.  He was also a member of the Orquesta Nacional de España and founder of the LIM contemporary music group.

He has written more than 600 works, 70 of them symphonic and the remainder popular. His symphonic works include compositions for Eb Clarinet, Clarinet and Sax.

The paso doble is a specialty of Manuel Lillo, who composed such well known paso dobles as "Plaza de las Ventas" or "Costa Dorada".

Manuel Lillo is also a transcriber of works for Symphonic Band.

Awards
1975, Gold Medal of Merit of Culture Minister of Spain (Banda Municipal Madrid)
2003, First prize in National Faller Pasodoble of Alzira

Selected works

Symphonic
Teren Rof, Concert No.1 for Eb Clarinet and Band
Suite para trompa, Concert No.1 for Horn and Band
Mares lunares, Symphony No.1
Vivencias, Concert No.2 for Eb Clarinet and Band
Sinfonia en el mar menor, Symphony No.2
Lillo canovas, Concert No.1 for Trumpet and Band
Ni en Paris, Concert for Eb Clarinet, Bb Clarinet and Band
Medir con vara, Concert for Trombone and Band
Betelgeuse, Symphony No.3
Fiesta mediterranea, Symphonic Suit
Palacia real de tafalla, Symphonic poem
Una maravilla muchachos, Symphonic poem
Cuadros abulenses, Symphonic suite

Chamber
"Formateados", Clarinets Quartet No.2
"Zaldua", Galop for Piccolo Clarinet. Galop for Clarinets Quartet
"Acuarelas", Clarinets Quartet No.3
"Con viento fresco", Clarinets Quartet No.4
"Tulaytula", Saxophone ensemble
"En equilibrio", Clarinets Quartet No.5
"Lambuco", Divertiment Violin & Piano / Eb Clarinet & Piano
"El máscara", Galop for Eb Clarinet
"Sopa caña", Saxophone ensemble

Pasodoble and March
"Costa blanca", Pasodoble
"Costa del azahar", Pasodoble
"Costa dorada", Pasodoble
"Kiosko del retiro", Pasodoble
"Plaza de las ventas", Pasodoble
"Comandante campos", Pasodoble
"Ramillete de claveles", Pasodoble
"Vicente Ferrero", Pasodoble
"Ciudad de Tafalla", Pasodoble
"Marcha de los embajadores", March-Pasodoble
"El capote", Pasodoble
"Viva la fiesta", March
"Coso y albero de bargas", Pasodoble
"El caporal", Pasodoble
"La unión de llira", Pasodoble

References

External links 
 
 RTVE-Música (Tribute to Manuel Lillo, Spanish Public Radio and TV)
 BSMM (Banda Sinfónica Municipal de Madrid)
 Golden Book (Golden book of Music in Spain 2009-2010)
 Diario EL PAÍS Mar-2010

Spanish composers
Spanish male composers
1940 births
Living people